Norbert Klatt (24 December 1949 – 1 October 2015) was a German scholar of Buddhism and Christianity and publisher; he was the founder of Norbert Klatt Verlag, Göttingen.

Klatt proposed Buddhist influence on some New Testament narratives (1982), particularly the conversion of Kassapa (Mahavagga 1.20.16) on Jesus walking on the water (Mark 6). From 1986 Klatt made investigations into the Life of Issa forgery of Nicolas Notovitch expanding his researches to include Mirza Ghulam Ahmad's claims of Jesus in India in 1988. Klatt concluded that the origin of Notovitch's story was "to be sought in Paris rather than India, Tibet or Ladakh," but left open the possibility that Notovitch had genuinely found Tibetan texts relating to Jesus misidentifying Bible portions that  Heinrich August Jäschke had translated into Tibetan in 1857–1868, decades before Notovitch's visit to Tibet.

Works

Books
 Johann Friedrich Blumenbach - editor of 5 volumes of Blumenbach Correspondence
 Literarkritische Beiträge zum Problem christlich-buddhistischer Parallelen - Köln : Brill, 1982 
 Lebte Jesus in Indien? - Göttingen : Wallstein-Verlag, 1988
 Jesu und Buddhas Wasserwandel - Göttingen : Klatt, 1990 (revision of 1982)
 Die Bosheit der Sexualität - Göttingen : Klatt, 1991
 Der Nachlass von Wilhelm Hübbe-Schleiden in der Niedersächsischen Staats- und Universitätsbibliothek Göttingen - Göttingen : Klatt, 1996
 Verflucht, versklavt, verketzert Göttingen : Klatt, 1998
 Zur Verwendung des Sektenbegriffs in Religion, Politik und Wirtschaft - Göttingen : Klatt, 1999
 Die Rivalin Gottes  Göttingen : Klatt, 2000
 Zur Instrumentalisierung der "Homosexualität" im Alten und Neuen Testament, Göttingen : Klatt, 2006

Articles
 N. Klatt, 'Jesus in Indien', in Orientierungen und Berichte 13, 1986 (Evgl. Zentralstelle fur Weltanschauungsfragen).

References

1949 births
2015 deaths
German male writers
German biblical scholars
German publishers (people)